is a Japanese skier. He competed in the Nordic combineds at the 1994 Winter Olympics and the 1998 Winter Olympics.

References

External links
 

1972 births
Living people
Japanese male Nordic combined skiers
Olympic Nordic combined skiers of Japan
Nordic combined skiers at the 1994 Winter Olympics
Nordic combined skiers at the 1998 Winter Olympics
Sportspeople from Aomori Prefecture